Between the Pines is an acoustic mixtape by American country music singer Sam Hunt. Hunt released the mixtape for free in October 2013, by his website. Some of the songs later appeared on his debut studio album Montevallo, while some were recorded by other artists. The mixtape was re-released on October 27, 2015, by MCA Nashville to commemorate the one-year anniversary of Hunt's debut studio album Montevallo. The album has sold 34,000 copies in the US as of January 2016.

Critical reception
Stephen Thomas Erlewine of AllMusic gave the album three stars out of five, writing that "what's most interesting about this 'acoustic mixtape' is how, even without the shiny veneer of Shane McAnally's studio production, Hunt's lithe soul and hip-hop influences are evident, both in the drum loops and his fleet cadences."

Track listing

Chart performance

References

2013 mixtape albums
MCA Records albums
Sam Hunt albums
Self-released albums
Albums produced by Zach Crowell